The 2023 Tucson mayoral election will be held on November 7, 2023, to elect the mayor of Tucson, Arizona. Incumbent Democratic mayor Regina Romero is running for re-election to a second term in office. Primary elections will be held on August 1.

Democratic primary

Declared 
Regina Romero, incumbent mayor
Francis Saitta, retired math teacher

Independents

Declared 
Ed Ackerley, advertising agency owner and runner-up for mayor in 2019
Zach Yentzer, neighborhood association president

References

External links 
Official campaign websites
 Ed Ackerley (I) for Mayor
 Regina Romero (D) for Mayor
 Zach Yentzer (I) for Mayor

2023
Tucson
Tucson